The Burned Hand is a 1915 American short drama film directed by Tod Browning.

Cast
 Miriam Cooper as Marietta
 Cora Drew as Marietta's mother
 William Hinckley as Billy Rider
 Jack Hull
 William Lowery as Marietta's father
 F. A. Turner (as Fred A. Turner)
 Charles West (as Charles H. West)
 Violet Wilkey
 William Wolbert as Billy's friend

References

External links

1915 films
Silent American drama films
American silent short films
American black-and-white films
1915 drama films
1915 short films
Films directed by Tod Browning
1910s American films